Due Date is a 2010 American black comedy road film directed by Todd Phillips, who wrote the screenplay with Alan R. Cohen, Alan Freedland, and Adam Sztykiel. The film follows a man (Robert Downey Jr.) who must get across the country to Los Angeles in time for the birth of his child and is forced to road-trip with an aspiring actor (Zach Galifianakis). Michelle Monaghan, Juliette Lewis, and Jamie Foxx also star. Shot in Las Cruces, New Mexico, Atlanta, Georgia, and Tuscaloosa, Alabama, the film was released on November 5, 2010. It received mixed reviews from critics and grossed $211 million worldwide.

Plot
Peter Highman, a successful architect, is due to fly home from Atlanta to Los Angeles to be with his wife Sarah, who is about to give birth. On the way to the airport, he has a chance encounter with Ethan Tremblay with his dog Sonny, who is going to Los Angeles to be an actor and is planning to scatter his recently deceased father's ashes at the Grand Canyon. When Ethan misuses the words "terrorist" and "bomb" while talking to Peter, they are both escorted off the plane. Peter, now on the No Fly List and missing his wallet, agrees to drive with Ethan to Los Angeles.

Ethan stops to buy marijuana, and Peter discovers that they are nearly out of money. Since Peter has no I.D., he gets his wife to wire money to Ethan, but discovers Ethan had the money wired to his stage name instead of his legal name. When the Western Union employee refuses to accept Ethan's "Stage name I.D." it leads to a violent altercation.

After a night at a rest stop, Peter decides to drive off and abandon Ethan, but realizes that he has forgotten to unload the ashes of Ethan's father when he left. This causes him to wrestle with his conscience, before deciding to return, and covering for his absence by saying he had gone to buy breakfast. Ethan takes over driver duty so Peter can get some rest after a sleepless night, but he falls asleep at the wheel and crashes the car. Peter calls his friend, Darryl, for assistance and decides to part with Ethan, but Darryl persuades Peter otherwise. They arrive at Darryl's house for rest. During their conversation, Ethan discovers hints that Sarah may have been unfaithful, triggering Peter to question Sarah's timely pregnancy. Darryl throws both of them out after mistakenly drinking some of Ethan's father's ashes, which were stored in a coffee tin.

Darryl lets them use his Range Rover to make the rest of the trip. Ethan and Peter get high and begin to bond, but Ethan then mistakenly drives to the Mexico–United States border. Despite assuring Peter that he'll handle the situation, Ethan flees, and Peter is arrested for possession of marijuana. The Mexican Federal Police lock Peter up, but Ethan steals a truck and breaks him out, causing several car crashes in the process.

Peter decides to stop at the Grand Canyon for Ethan, who finally scatters his father's ashes. Peter then confesses that he tried to leave Ethan at the rest area. Ethan makes a confession of his own: he has had Peter's wallet and I.D the entire time. Peter seemingly forgives him but then attacks Ethan in a rage, but is interrupted by a call from Sarah, who has just gone into labor. Peter and Ethan leave for California. Ethan finds a gun in the truck and he accidentally shoots Peter. Arriving at the hospital where Sarah is in labor, Peter passes out from loss of blood.

Sarah delivers the baby safely, and Peter expresses his discomfort at his new daughter being named Rosie Highman. Ethan leaves to meet with a Hollywood agent while telling Peter to call him. At the end, Ethan guest stars on an episode of his favorite television program, Two and a Half Men with Peter and Sarah watching it in bed with their daughter. Ethan texts Peter during the episode, indicating that the two have become friends.

Cast

 Robert Downey Jr. as Peter Highman
 Zach Galifianakis as Ethan Tremblay / Ethan Chase
 Michelle Monaghan as Sarah Highman
 Juliette Lewis as Heidi (Playing the same character from Old School)
 Jamie Foxx as Darryl Johnson
 Matt Walsh as TSA Agent
 RZA as Airline Screener
 Danny McBride as Western Union Employee Lonnie
 Todd Phillips as Barry
 Mimi Kennedy as Sarah's Mom
 Keegan-Michael Key as New Father
 Aaron Lustig as Dr. Greene
 Marco Rodríguez as Federal Agent
 Brody Stevens as Chauffeur
 Charlie Sheen as Charlie Harper 
 Jon Cryer as Alan Harper 
 Angus T. Jones as Jake Harper

Marketing
The first trailer was released July 14, 2010. It was seen with Inception, Dinner for Schmucks and The Other Guys. The international trailer was released on September 2, 2010, and the full length trailer was released online on September 16, 2010. It was shown before The Town, and Life as We Know It.

Previews for the film feature the songs "New Moon Rising" by Wolfmother and the original version of "Check Yo Self" by Ice Cube.

In the film, Ethan is a huge fan of the sitcom Two and a Half Men. He also mentions that he started a website called itsrainingtwoandahalfmen.com. As a joke, a website was actually launched with the same name. Ethan is also shown in the film as guest starring in a Two and a Half Men episode. This was a special short produced for the film's use, and did not become part of an official episode of the sitcom. The short was partially shown in the film and the full short is available online.

Music
Due Date (Original Motion Picture Soundtrack) was released on November 2, 2010 by WaterTower Music.

iTunes version

 Additional songs
The following songs are not included in the soundtrack, but they appear in some parts of the film:
 Closing Time – Danny McBride
 Mykonos – Fleet Foxes
 Old Man (Live at Massey Hall) – Neil Young
 Hey You – Pink Floyd
 Theme from Two and a Half Men

Release

Box office 
Due Date grossed $100.5 million in the U.S. and Canada and $111.2 million in other territories for a total of $211.8 million worldwide, against a production budget of $65 million.

The film earned $12.2 million at the North American domestic box office on its release day and $43.5 million on its first week, placing behind Megamind but was number one in the UK for two consecutive weekends. On November 8, 2010, it went up to #1 overtaking Megamind. On November 12, it went down to #3 behind Unstoppable and Megamind. On November 15, it went up to #2 behind Unstoppable. On November 24, it went down to #8 behind Harry Potter and the Deathly Hallows – Part 1, Tangled, Burlesque, Megamind, Love & Other Drugs, Unstoppable and Faster. It closed in theaters on January 27, 2011.

Home media 

Due Date was  released on DVD and Blu-ray on February 22, 2011.

Critical response 

On Rotten Tomatoes the film holds an approval rating of 39% based on 195 reviews and an average rating of 5.20/10. The website's critics consensus reads: "Shamelessly derivative and only sporadically funny, Due Date doesn't live up to the possibilities suggested by its talented director and marvelously mismatched stars." On Metacritic the film has a weighted average score of 51 out of 100, based on 39 critics, indicating "mixed or average reviews". Audiences polled by CinemaScore gave the film an average grade of "B−" on an A+ to F scale.

Roger Ebert of the Chicago Sun-Times gave the film two and a half stars out of a possible four, noting "The movie probably contains enough laughs to satisfy the weekend audience. Where it falls short is in the characters and relationships." Ebert compared Due Date to the 1987 film Planes, Trains and Automobiles, but bemoaned that Due Date could have learned and offered more.

References

External links 
 
 
 
 
 
 

2010 black comedy films
2010 films
2010s buddy comedy-drama films
2010 comedy-drama films
2010s pregnancy films
2010s road comedy-drama films
2010s screwball comedy films
American adventure comedy-drama films
American black comedy films
American buddy comedy-drama films
American pregnancy films
American road comedy-drama films
American screwball comedy films
2010s English-language films
Films scored by Christophe Beck
Films directed by Todd Phillips
Films set in Alabama
Films set in Atlanta
Films set in Arizona
Films set in California
Films set in Georgia (U.S. state)
Films set in Los Angeles
Films set in Louisiana
Films set in Mississippi
Films set in New Mexico
Films set in Texas
Films shot in New Mexico
Legendary Pictures films
Warner Bros. films
2010s American films